David Williams (1898 – 8 May 1984) was a noted British geologist.

Williams was born of Welsh parents in Liverpool, England. After studying civil engineering at the University of Liverpool, he became interested in geology after his twin brother Howel began to study geology. David Williams studied under Percy Boswell at the University of Liverpool. There David Williams received his Ph.D. for research on paleozoic volcanic rock in Snowdonia.

He was the Head of the Department of Geology at Imperial College London from 1950 to 1964; his predecessor as Head was H. H. Read and his successor was John Sutton.

David Williams was awarded the Lyell Medal in 1959.

Selected publications

References

20th-century British geologists
1898 births
1984 deaths
Alumni of the University of Liverpool
Academics of Imperial College London
Lyell Medal winners
Deans of the Royal School of Mines